New Tecumseth is a town in Simcoe County, in south-central Ontario, Canada.  While it is not officially a part of the Greater Toronto Area, it is counted, in terms of the census, as being a part of the Toronto Census Metropolitan Area.

History
The municipality was created through the amalgamation of the municipal governments of several communities with the Township of Tecumseth. The name 'New Tecumseth' was chosen because a Town of Tecumseh already exists in Essex County. The borders of the old township, with some adjustments along the eastern edge, and with the addition of all of Alliston, are the borders of the new town.

Communities
The main centres in New Tecumseth are the communities of Alliston, Tottenham, and Beeton.

The town also includes the smaller communities of Allimil, Green Briar, Nicolston, Penville, Randall, Rich Hill, Schomberg Heights and Thompsonville.

Education
New Tecumseth has nine elementary schools and two area high schools:

Alliston Union PS (Alliston)
Banting Memorial High School (Alliston)
Boyne River PS (Alliston)
Ernest Cumberland ES (Alliston)
FX O'Reilly Catholic School (Tottenham)
Monsignor Ronan Catholic School (Beeton)
St. James Catholic School (Tottenham)
St. Paul's Catholic School (Alliston)
St. Thomas Aquinas Catholic Secondary School (Tottenham)
Tecumseth Beeton ES (Beeton)
Tecumseth South Central PS (Tottenham)
Tottenham PS (Tottenham)
Alliston Community Christian School (Alliston)(Private)

Public schools are in the Simcoe County District School Board and Catholic with the Simcoe Muskoka Catholic District School Board.

Demographics

Notable persons
 Kate Aitken, influential cooking and homemaking expert, television and radio broadcaster, born in Beeton. A plaque was placed in Beeton Park in her honour.
 Dr Sir Frederick Banting, physician and scientist born in Alliston. Discovered insulin with his assistant, Charles Best.
 Sir William Osler, physician and professor of medicine was born in Bond Head (formerly in Tecumseth and now part of Bradford West Gwillimbury). He has been called 'the Father of Modern Medicine'.
 Deanne Rose, Olympic medal-winning soccer player was born in New Tecumseth.
 Jim Rutherford, retired NHL goaltender and Stanley-Cup-winning General Manager was born in Beeton.

See also
List of townships in Ontario

References

External links 

Lower-tier municipalities in Ontario
Municipalities in Simcoe County
Towns in Ontario
1991 establishments in Ontario